Best Recipes Ever is a Canadian cooking show, which debuted January 4, 2010 on CBC Television.  Produced by the CBC in conjunction with Canadian Living magazine, the show was hosted by Kary Osmond until January 2013, when Christine Tizzard took over as host.

In each half-hour episode the host demonstrates how to make three dishes, all of which fit a specific theme such as 'Best Comfort Food' or 'Best Middle Eastern Take Out'. Reruns of the show air in the United States on the Live Well Network in selected markets as a digital subchannel.

On March 18, 2014, CBC announced that Best Recipes Ever was cancelled.

Series overview

Episodes

Season 1 (2010)

References

External links 

  on Wayback Machine as of January 1, 2014
 

2010 Canadian television series debuts
CBC Television original programming
2014 Canadian television series endings
2010s Canadian cooking television series